Szamarzewo (German 1939-1945 Ellerode)  is a village in the administrative district of Gmina Kołaczkowo, within Września County, Greater Poland Voivodeship, in west-central Poland.

People 
 Zbigniew Kiernikowski (b. 1946), Roman Catholic bishop

References

Szamarzewo